Finchburg (also Finchberg, Finchburgh) is an unincorporated community in Monroe County, Alabama, United States. Amasa Coleman Lee, lawyer, legislator, and the father of Harper Lee, lived and worked in Finchburg.

Notes

Unincorporated communities in Monroe County, Alabama
Unincorporated communities in Alabama